Broadway East is a neighborhood in the East District of Baltimore. Its boundaries are the south side of North Avenue, the west side of Milton Street, the east side of Broadway, and the north side of Biddle Street. The neighborhood lies east of Oliver, north of Middle East, south of Lake Clifton, and west of Berea.

Though the area was once considered middle-class, it has in the last century experienced economic depression, housing abandonment, and increased crime. The neighborhood was affected by the Baltimore riot of 1968. Its residents are largely poor and working-class African Americans. A filming location for The Wire (TV series), a Baltimore-based HBO drama. The Broadway East community is undergoing a resurgence which includes the Mary Harvin Transformation Center and Senior Housing, the renovation of the American Brewery (building), the Baltimore Food Hub, and the Southern Streams Health and Wellness Center and Southern Views Multi-family Housing which is currently under construction and the development of affordable housing and mixed use property development cited in the East Baltimore Revitalization Plan adopted by the Baltimore City Planning Department in September 2018.

See also
List of Baltimore neighborhoods

References

External links

Baltimore '68: Riots and Rebirth Overview. Langsdale Library Special Collections. University of Baltimore.

 
African-American history in Baltimore
Gentrification in the United States
Neighborhoods in Baltimore
Poverty in Maryland
Working-class culture in Maryland